The Global Chinese Golden Chart Awards is a music awards founded by China National Radio and Hit FM in 2009.

Ceremonies

Categories 
 Best Album
 Most Popular Male Singer
 Most Popular Female Singer
 Best Male Singer
 Best Female Singer
 Most Popular Group
 Best Group
 Best Band
 Best Producer
 Most Popular New Artist
 Best New Artist (Gold)
 Best New Artist (Silver)
 Best New Artist (Copper)
 Best Stage Performance
 Best Singer-Songwriter
 Best Lyricist
 Best Composer
 Best Arranger

References 

Chinese music awards